Krishna Rajendra Hospital (K R Hospital) and Cheluvamba Hospitals are both tertiary referral centers and teaching hospitals attached to the Mysore Medical College in Mysore, Karnataka, India.

K R Hospital has a total bed capacity of around 1330 beds which includes 335 beds in general medicine, 313 in general surgery and about 500 in other specialties like ENT, ophthalmology, urology, plastic surgery, psychiatry and others.

A new multi-storied OPD building has recently been commissioned and this houses a state of the art ICCU on the ground floor and medical wards on other floors in addition to various consultation rooms.

The surgical wards are located in a separate building which is popularly known as the "stone building".

The hospital has a 24-hour casualty, radiology, microbiology, pathology and biochemistry laboratories, blood bank and pharmacy catering to its needs.

More recently a number of subspecialties have been introduced and patients have had the benefit of utilizing plastic surgery, urology, nephrology, cardiology, laser surgery, burns ward and dialysis services to mention a few.

See also
List of Heritage Buildings in Mysore

External links
Mysore Medical College

Education in Mysore
Hospitals in Mysore
Buildings and structures in Mysore
Year of establishment missing